Kate Ruth "Katie" Allen  (born 28 February 1974) is an Australian field hockey player. She was a member of the Australia women's national field hockey team that won gold medals at Commonwealth Games, Olympic Games and World Cup in the late 1990s and early 2000s. She is a past FIH World Player of the Year.

She won a gold medal at the 2000 Summer Olympics in Sydney.

Personal
Allen was born in Adelaide.

Field hockey - playing

Club hockey
Allen played for Burnside Hockey Club in South Australia as a junior.

State hockey
Allen was a member of the SA Suns team in the Australian Hockey League. She helped the SA Suns win the Australian Hockey League title in 1995.

International hockey
Allen played international hockey for the Australia women's national field hockey team (Hockeyroos), including the Commonwealth Games, Olympic Games and World Cup.

Following are the tournaments that Allen was part of:
1994 Women's Hockey World Cup (Dublin) - 1st GOLD 
1995 Women's Hockey Champions Trophy (Mar del Plata) - 1st GOLD
1997 Women's Hockey Champions Trophy (Berlin) - 1st GOLD
1998 Women's Hockey World Cup (Utrecht) - 1st GOLD 
1998 Commonwealth Games (Kuala Lumpur) - 1st GOLD
2000 Summer Olympics (Sydney) - 1st GOLD
2003 Women's Hockey Champions Trophy (Sydney) - 1st GOLD
2004 Summer Olympics (Athens) - 5th

In 2005 Allen was co-winner of the Women's FIH Player of the Year Awards.

Field hockey - coaching
Following her playing career Allen was the head coach of the Victorian Institute of Sport Hockey Program from 2009 to 2016.

In 2013 Allen was assistant coach of the Victorian Vipers in the Australian Hockey League.

In 2016 she was the Assistant Coach for the Australian Women’s junior team, the Jillaroos, who came third in the Junior World Cup in Chile medalling for the first time in 15 years in the competition.

Allen is the coach of the Camberwell Men's Premier League team in the Victorian Premier League Competition, becoming the first woman to coach a Men's Premier League team in Victoria.

Recognition
As a member of the 2000 Sydney Olympic Games gold medal winning Hockeyroos, Allen was named in the Australian Women's 'Team of the Century' at the 2013 ‘Centenary of Canberra Sportswomen’s Ball’ conducted at The Great Hall, Parliament House in Canberra.

The perpetual shield for Hockey SA's U15 Girls State Junior Zone Championship is named after Allen.

References

External links

1974 births
Living people
Sportswomen from South Australia
Australian female field hockey players
Olympic field hockey players of Australia
Field hockey players at the 2000 Summer Olympics
Field hockey players at the 2004 Summer Olympics
Olympic gold medalists for Australia
Olympic medalists in field hockey
Field hockey players from Adelaide
Medalists at the 2000 Summer Olympics
Commonwealth Games medallists in field hockey
Commonwealth Games gold medallists for Australia
Field hockey players at the 1998 Commonwealth Games
Recipients of the Medal of the Order of Australia
Medallists at the 1998 Commonwealth Games